Clayton Valley Charter High School (CVCHS) is a comprehensive charter high school located in Concord, California, United States, just under two miles from Clayton. Most of the school's students live in Clayton and the nearby Concord neighborhoods.

As a charter school, CVCHS has both a traditional principal as site leader and an executive director who heads the school district central office as superintendent. It also has a nine-member governing board.

CVCHS houses ClaytonArts Academy. It is the location of the local radio station 90.5 "The Edge" KVHS, which broadcasts mostly hard rock and heavy metal music. Its newspaper is The Talon, which is part of the High School National Ad Network. The current executive director is Dave Fehte.

History
Clayton Valley High School was founded in 1958, as part of the Mount Diablo Unified School District. It served areas of Clayton and Concord as a regular public high school for more than 50 years.

Converting Clayton Valley High School into a charter school was first suggested in 2010. A petition was submitted to MDUSD on June 9, 2011, and the proposal was debated for several months in 2011. Part of the controversy was that CVHS students who did not wish to attend CVCHS would be sent to other MDUSD high schools. The MDUSD Board of Trustees initially approved the proposal, then reversed its decision on November 8, 2011. Supporters of the charter movement filed an appeal with the Contra Costa County Board of Education, which on January 11, 2012, overturned the district's decision and approved the charter. As part of the transition, Clayton Valley High School officially closed on June 30, 2012. Clayton Valley Charter High School's first school year was 2012–2013; that year the school showed marked improvement on the Academic Performance Index and the football team won the divisional title for the first time.

Controversy 
In September 2018, a county investigation found that the two top leaders of the school, Dave Linzey, the school's Executive Director, and his wife, Eileen Linzey, the schools Chief Program Officer, had "raked in almost $850,000 in less than two years before leaving the school".  The couple had also misused funds, created job positions, and hired people in secret.  As of March 2019, an extensive audit spanning July 2012 to June 2018 was still underway.

In March 2019, a Contra Costa County Superior Court ordered Clayton Valley to pay back $857,000 to Mount Diablo Unified School District for the use of their facilities from the 2013-2017 school years. "Clayton Valley High claimed it spent hundreds of thousands of dollars to upgrade amenities for its female athletes [for Title IX] and asked Mt. Diablo to cover the construction costs."

Athletics
Clayton Valley's teams are the Eagles, known as the Ugly Eagles.

Notable alumni
 Blake Anderson, actor, producer, and screenwriter; co-star and co-creator of the show Workaholics
 Michael Busbee , (June 18, 1976 – September 29, 2019), known professionally as “busbee”, was an American songwriter, record producer, publisher, record label executive, and multi-instrumentalist. He graduated from Clayton Valley High School, class of 1994.
 Erin Dobratz, synchronized swimmer, Olympic medallist
 Kara Kohler, rower, Olympic medallist
 Clyde Mashore (1945–2016), professional baseball player
 Damon Mashore, former professional baseball player
 Justin Mashore, Major League Baseball coach
 Chris Mazza, Major league Baseball pitcher 
 Kahlil McKenzie, NFL player for the Cincinnati Bengals
 Kyle Newacheck, television writer, director, producer and actor; co-star, co-creator, director of the show Workaholics
 Scott Sanderson, former professional football player
 Bob Thomason, former college basketball coach
 Sam Williams, former professional football player

References

External links

 

High schools in Contra Costa County, California
Mount Diablo Unified School District
Public high schools in California
Charter high schools in California
1958 establishments in California